The Church of the Cross is a historic church on Calhoun Street in Bluffton, South Carolina.

It was built in 1857 and added to the National Register in 1975. It is currently in the Anglican Diocese of South Carolina and part of a larger Church of the Cross campus.

History

Earlier Congregations: 1767–1857
Formal worship in the Bluffton area traces its roots to the establishment in 1767 of St. Luke's Parish, where a church was built near Pritchardville in 1787. Service on “The Bluff” of the May River first took place in the early 1830s. The young town of Bluffton was a summer resort for area and inland planters and a stop on the ferry route between Savannah and Beaufort. By 1842, a chapel was built near the current location of The Church of the Cross.

Antebellum Period: 1857–1861
In July 1857, the present building was consecrated. Architect E. B. White designed a structure described then as a “handsome cruciform Gothic building”, which indeed it remains today. Fanned arches with a look of palmettos top its mullioned windows that are framed by latticed shutters. The builders sent to England for the rose-colored glass in the windows. Inside, soft-pink scored plaster enhances the warm light. Exposed pine timbers evoke power and stability.

Federal Occupation: 1861–1865
In 1863, Federal troops marched into Bluffton burning most of the town. Although the church was spared, its congregation fled. Services on The Bluff resumed in 1870, when the Rev. E. E. Bellinger arrived and oversaw repairs.

Post War: 1865–1975
In 1892, the roof was replaced, but the deadly hurricane of 1898 damaged it and the rest of the building. By February 1900, all was repaired. Workers remodeled the chancel and fashioned from the original pulpit and desk a walnut altar with a stone top, a lectern and a prayer desk. A chapel area was created in the Narthex which was easy to heat for the sparse winter congregation.

Current Congregation: 1975–Present
The National Register of Historic Places has listed The Church of the Cross since 1975. In keeping with the church's rapid growth, members built the first rectory in 1986. With continuing growth that the church has experienced in recent years, this building became the church business office in 2001.

In 1997, the Narthex wall was moved back to its original location, expanding nave seating for the growing congregation. Stairs now lead up to the renovated balcony above, which is home to the choir and the beautiful English pipe organ installed in 1999.

Worship
The worship department is, like the church itself, rooted in the doctrine and practice of the Anglican Church, and based in a blend of the Book of Common Prayer and contemporary worship. Five services are held each week:
Saturday, 5:28pm – Gracetime: Contemporary Eucharist
Sunday, 8:00am – Traditional Holy Eucharist
 Sunday, 9:00 & 10:30am – CrossPoint: Modern/Contemporary (located off-site at Cross Schools Campus, 495 Buckwalter Parkway, Bluffton)
Sunday, 10:00am – Blended Holy Eucharist

References

External links

The Church of the Cross Website

Churches on the National Register of Historic Places in South Carolina
National Register of Historic Places in Beaufort County, South Carolina
Carpenter Gothic church buildings in South Carolina
Churches completed in 1857
19th-century churches in the United States
Churches in Beaufort County, South Carolina
Buildings and structures in Bluffton, South Carolina
1842 establishments in South Carolina
19th-century Anglican church buildings
Anglican Church in North America church buildings in the United States
Former Episcopal church buildings in South Carolina
Anglican realignment congregations